Reclaim, reclaimed, reclaimer, reclaiming or reclamation means "to get something back". 

It may refer to:

 Land reclamation, creating new land from oceans, riverbeds, or lake beds
 Dedesertification, reversing of the land degradation in arid and semi-arid regions 
 Mine reclamation, restoring land that has been mined to a usable state
 Stream restoration, improving the environmental health of streams and rivers
 Street reclamation, to increase non-car uses of streets

Materials
 Reclaimed water, converting wastewater into water that can be used for other purposes
 Mechanically separated meat, a paste-like meat product
 Landfill mining, excavation and processing of materials from landfills
 Materials recovery facility, a specialized plant that receives, separates and prepares recyclable materials
 Refrigerant reclamation
 Crumb rubber or reclaimed rubber, recycled rubber produced from automotive scrap tires
 Reclaimed asphalt pavement (RAP), removed pavement materials containing asphalt and aggregates
 Full depth recycling, a process that rebuilds worn-out asphalt pavements by recycling the existing roadway
 Sand reclamation, reclamation of stamp sand previously dumped in the water
 Reclaimed lumber, reuse of processed wood primarily for decoration and home building
 Ecohouse, made with reclaimed materials

Politics
 Reclaimed word or reappropriation, a pejorative word or slur used as an affirmation with positive connotation
 Individual reclamation, the theft of resources by the poor from the rich
 Reclaiming Patriotism, in Australia
 Reclaim Australia: Reduce Immigration
 Reclaim Australia, a far-right political party
 Reclaim the Streets, anti-car/pro-public-spaces movement
 Reclaim the Dream commemorative march, in the US
 Reclaim The Records, a movement to increase availability of public records in the US
 "Reclaiming my time", a phrase used by Maxine Waters
 Reclaiming Health and Safety For All, a report in the UK
 Reclaim Party,  a British political party founded by actor Laurence Fox in 2020

Law
 Presidential power reclamation, covered by the twenty-fifth Amendment to the United States Constitution
 Citizenship reclamation, part of the German Citizenship Project
 United States Bureau of Reclamation, a federal agency which oversees water resource management
 Newlands Reclamation Act, a 1902 United States federal law that funded irrigation projects
 Reclamation fund, a special fund established by the 1902 law
 Reclamation district, special-purpose districts which are responsible for reclaiming and maintaining threatened land
 Surface Mining Control and Reclamation Act of 1977, a 1977 law in the US
 Three Kids Mine Remediation and Reclamation Act, a 2013 law in the US
 RECLAIM Act, a proposed 2017 mining reclamation law in the US
 Regional Clean Air Incentives Market (RECLAIM), an emissions trading program in California

Religion
 Center for Reclaiming America for Christ
 Reclaiming (Neopaganism), a Pagan earth-based spirituality movement

As a synonym for rehabilitation
 Reclaiming Futures, a non-profit in the US
 Reclamation of fallen women, by the Church penitentiary in the UK
 Rehabilitation (penology), re-integration into society of a convicted person

As a synonym for sewage treatment
 Clark County Water Reclamation District, Clark County, Nevada, US
 Metropolitan Water Reclamation District of Greater Chicago, Illinois, US
 Riverside Park Water Reclamation Facility, Spokane, Washington, US
 Thomas P. Smith Water Reclamation Facility, Tallahassee, Florida, US
 Tillman Water Reclamation Plant, Los Angeles, California, US

Music
 Reclaim (album), 2003 album by Keep of Kalessin
 Reclaim Australia (album), 2016 album by A.B. Original
 Reclamation (Bigwig album), 2006
 Reclamation (Candlelight Red album), 2013
 Reclamation (Front Line Assembly album), 1997
 Reclaimed (radio show) in Canada

Technology
 Samsung Reclaim, an eco-friendly feature phone with a sliding keyboard
 Reclaimer, a machine used to handle bulk materials
 Baggage reclaim in airports, see also Baggage carousel
 HMS Reclaim
 USS Reclaimer (ARS-42), a 1945 salvage ship
 Reclaim helmet, a type of diving helmet

Other uses
 Reclaim (film), a 2014 thriller film starring John Cusack and Ryan Phillippe
 Reclaimed (TV series), a 2020 Discovery Channel USA reality television program about mining, hunting, backcountry camping/cottages, and land claims
 Reclaimed factories, a form of workers' self-management in socialism
 Reclaimed Space, an American company

See also 

 Reclaimer (disambiguation)
 
 
 Claim (disambiguation)
 Restoration (disambiguation)